Shih is the Wade–Giles equivalent of Shi in Chinese. It may refer to:

Shi (poetry) (詩/诗), a term for Chinese poetry
Shí (surname), the romanization of several Chinese surnames
Shi (class) (士), the low aristocratic class of Shang/Zhou China, later the scholar-gentry class of imperial China
Shi (personator) (尸), a ceremonial "corpse" involved in early forms of ancestor worship in China
Posthumous name (諡), a traditional East Asian honorary name
 Shih (市), various administrative divisions generally translated "city" on Taiwan and in mainland China
 Shih (時), a traditional Chinese unit of time equal to two hours
Shih, transliteration of Chinese Radical 44
 Shih (composer) or Shih Chieh, Taiwanese-Austrian composer

See also
Shi (disambiguation)